Assinia is a genus of beetles in the family Cerambycidae, containing the following species:

 Assinia affinis Téocchi & Sudre, 2002
 Assinia alluaudi Lameere, 1893
 Assinia inermis (Aurivillius, 1908)
 Assinia pulchra Breuning, 1940
 Assinia pumilio (Kolbe, 1893)

References

Apomecynini
Cerambycidae genera